El-Hassania Darami (listed in some sources as "Elhassania" or "Hassania"; born 10 December 1953) is a former Moroccan long-distance runner who specialised in 1500 metres, 3000 metres, and 10,000 metres events. She won six medals in four different African Championships from 1979 to 1988, including one gold in 10,000 metres at the 1985 African Championships in Athletics. She also competed for Morocco in the 1988 Summer Olympics in the same event, but did not progress to the finals.

Achievements

References

External links

1953 births
Living people
Moroccan female long-distance runners
Olympic athletes of Morocco
Athletes (track and field) at the 1988 Summer Olympics